Kennalestes is an extinct genus of insectivorous mammal resembling a shrew that was described in 1968. The type species is K. gobiensis and it was a common mammal in Mongolia during the Cretaceous period, found in both the Bayan Mandahu Formation and Djadochta Formation. It was found in Mongolia during the Campanian, so it might've fallen victim to such predators as Velociraptor, Oviraptor and Archaeornithoides.

References

Extinct animals of Asia
Leptictids
Cretaceous mammals
Fossil taxa described in 1968
Prehistoric mammal genera